Androsthenes was the name of a number of men in classical antiquity:

Androsthenes of Thasos, an admiral of Alexander the Great
Androsthenes of Cyzicus, a general of Antiochus III the Great
Androsthenes of Corinth, a Greek general who fought the Romans
Androsthenes of Thessaly, a general of Julius Caesar
Androsthenes of Athens, a sculptor; see Praxias and Androsthenes